Quinaquinani (possibly from Aymara qina qina an Andean cane flute; something full of holes, -ni a suffix to indicate ownership, "the one with the qina qina" or "the one with many holes") is a mountain in the Andes of Peru, about  high. It is situated in the Moquegua Region, Mariscal Nieto Province, Carumas District, and in the Puno Region, Puno Province, Acora District. It lies south of the mountain Arichua.

References

Mountains of Moquegua Region
Mountains of Puno Region
Mountains of Peru